U.S. Route 278 (US 278) is a  east–west United States highway that traverses through the South Carolina Lowcountry, from North Augusta to Hilton Head Island.

Route description
After crossing the Savannah River from Georgia, US 278 bypasses downtown North Augusta, South Carolina to the south en route to Beech Island and Johnson Crossroads.  It then forms a de facto northern boundary of the Savannah River Site, crossing into the property on a few occasions.  The route then continues eastward and then southward through the communities of Barnwell, Kline, Allendale, Fairfax, Hampton, Varnville, Ridgeland, and Hardeeville where it meets I-95.  US 278 shares the route between Ridgeland and Hardeeville with US 17.

From Allendale to Almeda, US 278 runs along the CSX Augusta Subdivision.

Upon reaching Hardeeville, the route heads eastward toward the Atlantic with large residential and commercial developments lining the spine of the road from Hardeeville through Okatie and Bluffton. The route crosses over Calibogue Sound onto Hilton Head Island.  After a five-mile stretch in which the route is tolled, US 278 ends at US 278 Business on the southern portion of Hilton Head Island, just outside Sea Pines Plantation.

Cross Island Parkway

On Hilton Head Island, US 278 was previously routed along what is now US 278 Business until a new toll road, named the Cross Island Parkway, opened on January 16, 1998. The  section of roadway cost $83 million to build and was funded with a combination of state funds, federal funds, state highway bonds and tolls.

The controlled access toll road has only one interchange along its route at Marshland Drive. It was the first toll road built in South Carolina in modern history. A majority of the road users pay their tolls using Palmetto Pass, South Carolina's system for electronic toll collection. Tolls were removed on June 30, 2021, not long after the last of the bonds sold to build the road were retired.

The completion of the Cross Island Parkway (a direct expressway connection from the north side to the south side of the island) has caused a great amount of commercial and residential development along the road. Before the toll road opened, it could take one hour to travel the  route of what was then signed as US 278 (William Hilton Parkway) during peak tourism season. The Cross Island Parkway greatly relieved congestion on that road when it opened.

History
US 278 was established, in South Carolina, in 1965, traveling from Augusta, Georgia to Hilton Head Island.  Crossing the Savannah River, in concurrency with US 1/US 25/US 78/SC 121, it then overlapped with SC 125 on Atomic Road, to Beech Island.  Replacing SC 28 from Beech Island to Almeda, where it then replaced SC 128, going through Ridgeland, to Old House.  Replacing part of SC 462, it went south into Bluffton and then east into Hilton Head Island, replacing part of SC 46.

Throughout the 1980s, US 278 was widen to four-lane, in phases, east of SC 170, in Bluffton.  In 1996-1997, US 278 was rerouted south of Ridgeland to Hardeeville, then east on new primary routing to SC 170, in Bluffton.  Its former routing was replaced by SC 336 to Old House and SC 462 to SC 170.  In 1998, US 278 was rerouted onto new routing along the west side of Hilton Head Island; known as the Cross Island Parkway, the toll road provides quicker access to the far south end of the island.  The old alignment, in Hilton Head Island, became US 278 Business.

Tolls

Toll rates, for 2-axle vehicles, along Cross Island Parkway were $1.25 at the toll plaza and $1.00 at the Marshland Road/Spanish Wells Road interchange.  Each additional axle was $1.00 (plaza and ramps).  The toll plaza had both electronic toll collection (ETC) and cash lanes, which were staffed 24 hours a day; Marshland Road/Spanish Wells Road interchange accept only ETC or exact change only.  Those that did not have exact change or do not pay the toll had five days to contact the Cross Island Parkway Customer Service Center to make a payment; after that time, a violation notice was mailed.  Travelers that made a mistake of taking the toll road may request a "Turn Around Pass", which gives them ten minutes to continue along the highway, turn around at the roundabout and return the pass at the toll plaza on the return trip.

On July 1, 2021, the tolls were removed because the final bond payment was paid on the $81 million road that was opened in 1998.

Major intersections

See also
 
 
 Special routes of U.S. Route 278

References

External links

 
 US 278 at Virginia Highways' South Carolina Highways Annex

78-2
Transportation in Aiken County, South Carolina
Transportation in Barnwell County, South Carolina
Transportation in Allendale County, South Carolina
Transportation in Hampton County, South Carolina
Transportation in Jasper County, South Carolina
Transportation in Beaufort County, South Carolina
 South Carolina